is a train station in Kashiwara, Osaka Prefecture, Japan.

Lines
Kintetsu Railway
Domyoji Line

Layout

Stations next to Kashiwara-minamiguchi

Railway stations in Japan opened in 1924
Railway stations in Osaka Prefecture